Peter-No-Tail and the Great Treasure Hunt is a 2000 Swedish live action film directed by Mikael Ekman.

Plot

Cast
 Björn Kjellman-Pelle Svanslös
 Cecilia Ljung-Maja Gräddnos
 Christer Fant-Elaka Måns
 Leif Andrée-Bill
 Göran Thorell-Bull
 Suzanne Ernrup-Gullan Från Arkadien
 Brasse Brännström-Trisse
 Jonas Uddenmyr-Murre Från Skogtibble
 Lena-Pia Bernhardsson-Maja Gräddnos Mamma
 Peter Harryson-Pettersson
 Siw Malmkvist-Gammel-Maja I Domkrykotornet
 Lars Dejert-Tusse Batong
 Krister Henriksson-Berättarröster
 Anna Björk-Fröken Som Katten

External links
 

Films based on Swedish novels
Swedish animated films
2000 animated films
2000 films
Animated films about cats
Swedish children's films
Films directed by Mikael Ekman
2000s children's animated films
2000s Swedish films